Mu shuvuu (harmful bird) is a mythological bird in Turkic mythology and Tengrism. They would look like young girls but have a sharp beak, which they try to cover either in a veil or with their hands. With their beaks, they would try to suck out the blood of the bodies of their victims. They were especially dangerous to travellers or lonely hunters. Mu shuvuu is believed to be usually created when a girl dies young or by violent death. The girl's soul would turn into a mu shuvuu then. When a father hides a flint in his deceased daughters hand, however, he would turn her soul into one as well.

Citations 

Mongol mythology
Siberian deities
Turkic demons